Shandon Joint Unified School District is a school district in San Luis Obispo County, California.

References

External links
 Official district website

School districts in San Luis Obispo County, California